Jean Baptiste Hippolyte Dance (22 February 1797, in Saint-Pal-de-Chalencon – 18 April 1832, Paris) was a French pathologist remembered for Dance's sign. He was the son of a physician, and studied medicine in Paris, gaining his M.D. in 1826. He worked as physician to the Hôpital Cochin, and had just been employed as a teacher at the clinic at l'Hôtel-Dieu when he died of cholera aged 35. Despite his early death he left a number of publications, including his eponymous sign and an early description of parathyroid tetany, which occurs in hypoparathyroidism.

External links

References 

19th-century French physicians
French pathologists
1797 births
1832 deaths
Deaths from cholera